British Dominions Women's Suffrage Union was a women's organization, founded in 1913 and dissolved in 1922.

It was founded in New Zealand in 1913 by Margaret Hodge and Harriet Newcomb. It organized the suffrage organisations of the British colonies. Among its members were New Zealand, Australia, South Africa and Canada. It held international conferences in London in 1916 and 1918. It changed its name to British Dominions Women Citizens' Union in 1918. In 1922, it was dissolved in to the British Overseas Committee of the International Woman Suffrage Alliance.

References 

Suffrage organisations in the United Kingdom